The European Tour 2015/2016 – Event 5 (also known as the 2015 Gibraltar Open) was a professional minor-ranking snooker tournament held between 9–13 December 2015 in Gibraltar.

Marco Fu made the 116th official maximum break in the fifth frame of his last 64 match against Sam Baird. This was Fu's fourth official 147 break and also the second maximum break in the 2015/2016 season.

Prize fund
The breakdown of prize money of the event is shown below:

Main draw

Preliminary rounds

Round 1
Best of 7 frames

Round 2
Best of 7 frames

Main rounds

Top half

Section 1

Section 2

Section 3

Section 4

Bottom half

Section 5

Section 6

Section 7

Section 8

Finals

Century breaks 

 147, 140, 133  Marco Fu
 144  Liang Wenbo
 142, 104  Zhao Xintong
 135  Liam Highfield
 133, 127  Sam Baird
 132, 114, 110  Michael White
 130  David Grace
 129, 127  Dominic Dale
 129, 105  Mark Selby
 125  Michael Holt
 124  Andrew Higginson
 120, 103  Alfie Burden
 116, 101  Mike Dunn
 111, 105  Stuart Bingham
 110  Graeme Dott
 108  Richard Beckham

 107  Nigel Bond
 107  Adam Duffy
 106, 103, 101  Luca Brecel
 106  Xiao Guodong
 104  Tom Ford
 104  George Pragnall
 103  Mark Davis
 102  Chris Melling
 102  Ricky Walden
 102  Kyren Wilson
 102  Daniel Wells
 101  Michael Georgiou
 101  Tian Pengfei
 101  Hossein Vafaei
 100  Mark King

References

Gibraltar Open
ET5
2015 in Gibraltarian sport